Martin Bukata (born 2 October 1993) is a Slovak footballer who plays for Spartak Trnava as a midfielder.

Club career

MFK/VSS Košice
Bukata made his first Corgoň Liga appearance on 11 March 2012, coming on as a substitute for Kamil Kuzma in the 84th minute of a 0–1 home loss against Slovan Bratislava. On 2 March 2013, he scored his first goals for Košice against the biggest rival team Tatran Prešov, Košice defeated Prešov 3–0.

Benevento
On 1 August 2018, Bukata signed with Serie B side Benevento. His Benevento contract was dissolved by mutual consent on 9 January 2019.

Karviná
On 21 January 2019, he joined Czech club Karviná. He described the 2019–20 as unique and unusual, as he had to enter quarantine three-times, while with Karviná, due to the COVID-19 pandemic. He was a regular in the starting line-up initially but was later sidelined and placed on to the bench, contributing to him becoming free agent in July 2020.

Spartak Trnava
On 27 July 2020, Bukata had signed with Spartak Trnava in his native Slovakia, joining the club's goalkeeper Dobrivoj Rusov, who is the godfather of Bukata's son. He also joined Erik Pačinda, a former teammate from VSS Košice, who had signed just days earlier. The club had disclosed that they had worked on Bukata's arrival for about a year and Bukata, in turn, expressed his gratitude and commitment to the club.

International career
He debuted for the U-21 side on 21 March 2013 in a 0–1 away loss against Austria.

Bukata was first called up to the senior national team for two unofficial friendly fixtures held in Abu Dhabi, UAE, in January 2017, against Uganda and Sweden by his former coach from MFK Košice - Ján Kozák. He capped his debut against Uganda, being fielded from the start until the 70th minute, when he was substituted by Tomáš Huk. Slovakia went on to lose the game 1–3. Bukata also played the second half of the historic 0–6 loss to Sweden. It took about 5 years for his further recognitions in national team nominations, when Francesco Calzona listed him as an alternate fixtures in September and November, as well as prospective national team players' training camp in December.

Honours
MFK Košice
Slovak Cup: 2013–14

Spartak Trnava
Slovak Cup: 2021–22

External links
MFK Košice Profile
Corgoň Liga Profile

UEFA Profile

References

1993 births
Living people
Sportspeople from Košice
Association football midfielders
Slovak footballers
Slovak expatriate footballers
FC VSS Košice players
Piast Gliwice players
Benevento Calcio players
MFK Karviná players
FC Spartak Trnava players
Ekstraklasa players
Slovak Super Liga players
Expatriate footballers in Poland
Slovak expatriate sportspeople in Poland
Expatriate footballers in Italy
Slovak expatriate sportspeople in Italy
Expatriate footballers in the Czech Republic
Slovak expatriate sportspeople in the Czech Republic